"Loring Heights" can also refer to the Stevens Square/Loring Heights neighborhood in Minneapolis, Minnesota.
Loring Heights is a neighborhood of just over 300 homes located in south Buckhead neighborhood of Atlanta, nestled between Peachtree Street, on the east, Northside Drive on the west, and Atlantic Station to the south. Like most of Buckhead, Loring Heights is part of City Council District 8 and is currently represented by Mary Norwood. The neighborhood provides relatively easy access to I-75/85, GA 400, and I-285. 

The neighborhood is part of NPU E, which includes:
 Ansley Park
 Ardmore
 Atlantic Station
 Brookwood
 Brookwood Hills
 Georgia Tech
 Home Park
 Loring Heights
 Marietta Street Artery
 Midtown
 Sherwood Forest

The neighborhood is composed of bungalows from the 1940s and new construction infills. The school system includes E. Rivers Elementary, Sutton Middle, and North Atlanta High Schools.
The Loring Heights subdivision was developed by Edgar H. Sims, Sr. an Atlanta builder and developer, who also developed Collier Hills and a number of other subdivisions in the Atlanta area during the 1930s and 1940s.  The homes were marketed by Sharp Boylston Company.

References

External links
 Loring Heights Homeowners Association

Neighborhoods in Atlanta